Niamh Fiona Holland (born 27 October 2004) is an English cricketer who currently plays for Somerset and Western Storm. An all-rounder, she is a right-arm medium bowler and right-handed batter.

Early life
Holland was born in Yeovil, Somerset, but her home town is nearby Langport, and she plays club cricket for Street Cricket Club.

Domestic career
Holland made her county debut in 2019, for Somerset against Wales. She achieved her List A high score on debut, scoring 37. She took 10 wickets in the 2019 Women's Twenty20 Cup at an average of 15.10, helping Somerset win Division 2 of the competition. In 2021, she took 6 wickets at an average of 17.00 in the Twenty20 Cup. She was Somerset's joint-leading wicket-taker in the 2022 Women's Twenty20 Cup, with 12 wickets at an average of 18.11.

In 2020, Holland played for Western Storm in the Rachael Heyhoe Flint Trophy. She appeared in all six matches, and took one wicket. She was retained in the Western Storm squad for the 2021 season, but did not play a match. She was also included in the Western Storm Academy squad for 2021. She played seven matches for Western Storm in 2022, across the Charlotte Edwards Cup and the Rachael Heyhoe Flint Trophy, taking four wickets. In March 2023, it was announced that Holland had signed her first professional contract with Western Storm.

International career
In October 2022, Holland was selected in the England Under-19 squad for the 2023 ICC Under-19 Women's T20 World Cup. She played six matches in the tournament, scoring 138 runs at an average of 27.60 including scoring 59 against Zimbabwe.

References

External links

2004 births
Living people
People from Yeovil
Somerset women cricketers
Western Storm cricketers